Laporte is a borough and the county seat of Sullivan County, Pennsylvania, United States. The population was 320 at the 2020 census. It is the county seat of Sullivan County. Laporte is surrounded by Laporte Township. It was named for John Laporte. It is the smallest county seat in Pennsylvania by population (as of the 2000 Census), and in 1969 was one of the two smallest in the United States.

History
The Pennsylvania Guide, compiled by the Writers' Program of the Works Progress Administration, described Laporte in 1940 as: The Sullivan County Courthouse was added to the National Register of Historic Places in 1978.

Geography
Within the borough lies Lake Mokoma.

Climate

LaPorte has a humid continental climate (Köppen Dfb), with warm summers and cold, snowy winters.

Demographics

At the 2010 census, there were 316 people, 109 households, and 67 families residing in the borough. The population density was 287.3 people per square mile (112.2/km2). There were 251 housing units at an average density of 228.2 per square mile (89.1/km2). The racial makeup of the borough was 98.1% White, 0.6% African American, 0.9% Native American, and 0.3% Asian.  Hispanics or Latinos of any race makes up 0.9% of the borough population.

Of the 109 households, 14.7% had children under the age of 18 living with them, 54.1% were married couples living together, 3.7% had a female householder with no husband present, and 38.5% were non-families. 34.9% of households were one person, and 22% were one person aged 65 or older. The average household size was 2.01 and the average family size was 2.54.

In the borough the population was spread out, with 8.5% under the age of 18, 49.1% from 18 to 64, and 42.4% 65 or older. The median age was 61.7 years.

The median household income was $43,750 and the median family income was $52,500. Males had a median income of $30,625 versus $25,500 for females. The per capita income for the borough was $18,762. About 3.6% of families and 7.4% of the population were below the poverty line, including 10.9% of those under the age of eighteen and none of those 65 or over.

References

County seats in Pennsylvania
Populated places established in 1850
Boroughs in Sullivan County, Pennsylvania
1853 establishments in Pennsylvania